Kia electric vehicle may refer to one or more of the following electric vehicles produced by Korean automobile manufacturer Kia:

 Niro EV (e-Niro in Europe), 2018-present
 Soul EV (e-Soul in Europe), 2014-present